The Democratic Alliance for the Betterment and Progress of Hong Kong (DAB) is a pro-Beijing conservative political party in Hong Kong. Chaired by Starry Lee and holding 13 Legislative Council seats, it is currently the largest party in the legislature and in terms of membership, far ahead of other parties. It has been a key supporting force to the SAR administration and the central government's policies on Hong Kong.

The party was established in 1992 as the "Democratic Alliance for the Betterment of Hong Kong" by a group of traditional Beijing loyalists who pledged allegiance to the Chinese Communist Party. As the transfer of sovereignty over Hong Kong was approaching, the party actively participated in elections in the last years of the colonial rule and became one of the major party and the ally to the government in the early post-handover era.

The DAB took a major blow in the 2003 District Council election due to the unpopular Tung Chee-hwa administration and the proposed legislation of the Article 23 of the Basic Law. However, the party still managed to recover its loss in the following decades, further expanded its electoral base and membership and absorbed the pro-business Hong Kong Progressive Alliance in 2005, becoming the a dominant force in Hong Kong politics.

The party received electoral successes in the 2007 and 2011 District Council elections, winning 136 local elected offices at its peak, and won 13 seats in the 2012 Legislative Council election thanks to its effective electoral strategy. In the 2019 District Council election, however, the party received a significant loss of four-fifth of its seats the midst of the widespread anti-government protests.

History

Founding and the reunification (1992–1998)
The Democratic Alliance for the Betterment of Hong Kong was founded as part of a wave of political party formations as Hong Kong approached its handover to China and amid electoral reform initiated by Governor Chris Patten. The 1991 Legislative Council election, which saw the defeat of all pro-Beijing candidates, was a catalyst to the forming of the DAB. In January 1992, director of the Hong Kong and Macau Affairs Office Lu Ping publicly encouraged the organisation of pro-Beijing political parties for the 1995 elections. Politicians from the Hong Kong Federation of Trade Unions (FTU) and other pro-Beijing organisations including the Hong Kong Federation of Education Workers (FEW) formed the DAB on 10 July 1992, with Tsang Yok-sing as the party's first chairperson. The DAB was the first major pro-Beijing party as a part of the united front on the eve of the handover of Hong Kong.

Compared with other pro-Beijing parties in Hong Kong, the DAB was more grassroots-oriented. The 56 founding members of the DAB held political views that were sympathetic towards China and emphasised friendly Sino-Hong Kong relations. At the time of founding, many of them held political positions associated with the Chinese government or pro-Beijing groups in Hong Kong. Chairman Tsang Yok-sing was a delegate to Guangdong Province People's Political Consultative Conference, vice-chairman Tam Yiu-chung and Chan Yuen-han were executive members of the pro-Beijing trade union FTU, and secretary Cheng Kai-nam was appointed by the Chinese government as the Hong Kong Affairs Advisor. Political scientist Sonny Lo Shiu-hing notes that early DAB members are also "pro-Hong Kong" in the sense that they advocate for the interests of Hong Kong and lobby Chinese officials.

The DAB became the direct rival to the major pro-democracy party United Democrats of Hong Kong and its successor Democratic Party, which was formed in 1994. The DAB first fielded a candidate in the 1993 Regional Council by-election and lost. In the following year, the DAB participated in the 1994 District Board elections, where 37 of its 83 candidates were elected. In 1995, it participated in the municipal elections, winning eight directly elected and two indirectly elected seats. Major leaders of the DAB participated in the 1995 Legislative Council election. It was regarded as test cases of the popularity of the new party. Three of the four party leaders were defeated by pro-democracy candidates in the election, including party chairman Tsang Yok-sing who lost to Liu Sing-lee of the Association for Democracy and People's Livelihood (ADPL) in the Kowloon Central constituency.

The DAB took part in the preparation for establishing the Special Administrative Region on the eve of the handover of Hong Kong. In January 1996, Tsang Yok-sing, Tam Yiu-chung, Ng Hong-mun and Lee Cho-jat were appointed to the Preparatory Committee. It had 46 members elected to the Beijing-controlled Selection Committee in November 1996. In the following month, the Selection Committee elected 10 DAB members to the Provisional Legislative Council (PLC). The DAB and the Hong Kong Progressive Alliance (HKPA), another pro-Beijing party, allied with each other in the crucial Provisional Legislative Council debate on the substantial arrangements for the 1998 LegCo elections. This move was tacitly endorsed by the Heung Yee Kuk, and heralded as the unofficial merger of the parties. The Provisional Legislative Council, which was controlled by the pro-Beijing camp, vetoed the democratic reform introduced by the last British governor Chris Patten and replaced the first-past-the-post with the proportional representation method in the Legislative Council elections, so that the weaker DAB would be able to exploit the benefit of the proportional representation by taking a seat in every geographical constituency without having a majority of the votes. After the SAR was established, Tam Yiu-chung and was also appointed to the Executive Council by Chief Executive Tung Chee-hwa as the representative of the party.

Early Tung Chee-hwa administration and Article 23 setback (1998–2003)

The DAB's electoral campaigns have been largely assisted by Beijing and its united front organs. The Liaison Office would mobilise various social groups and organisations to campaign for and to vote for the party, including employees of PRC state-owned companies and grassroots organisations such as the New Territories Association of Societies (NTAS) and the Kowloon Federation of Associations (KFA). The DAB's sister organisation FTU also mobilised its workers to campaign for the DAB members. The FTU also sent a recommendation letter to its four hundred thousand members to seek support for DAB candidates.

In the 1998 LegCo election, the DAB took five directly elected seats with a quarter of the popular vote, compared to only two seats with 15% of the votes in the 1995 elections. According to Karl Ho, the change from a candidate-based system to an electoral list proportional representation system benefitted the DAB.

In December 1998, the party's 5th Central Committee decided to increase a Vice-Chairmanship, Ip Kwok-him and Cheng Kai-nam were subsequently elected as vice-chairmen. In the first District Council elections in November 1999, the party filled in 176 candidates, 83 of which were elected, more than double compared to the 1994 elections.

In the second SAR LegCo elections in September 2000, despite the conflict of interests scandal of Cheng Kai-nam, the DAB became a clear winner, capturing 11 seats in total, 7 in geographical constituency direct elections, 3 in functional constituencies and 1 Election Committee constituency. Although Cheng Kai-nam was elected, he soon resigned his party posts and LegCo seat under public pressure. After DAB candidate Christopher Chung Shu-kun losing to pro-democracy Independent Audrey Eu in the 10 December Hong Kong Island by-election, the DAB commanded 10 LegCo seats by the end of 2000.

In July 2002 the beginning of the second term of Tung Chee-hwa's administration, Chairman Tsang Yok-sing was appointed to the Executive Council under the Principal Officials Accountability System (POAS), succeeding Tam Yiu-chung. However the governing coalition between Tung Chee-hwa the DAB and the pro-business Liberal Party suffered from growing disunity as the popularity of Tung administration dropped. Although it continued provide stable support to the government as Beijing's demand, it paid a hefty political price in the sense of increasing middle-class disaffection with the party and growing rank-and file complaint. The DAB was increasingly frustrated by unequal political exchange with the government and the skimpy political rewards meted out by Tung. Tsang Yok-sing even openly aired his displeasure and advocated power sharing with the government.

In the wake of the controversies over the legislation of Article 23 of the Basic Law, which outlaws treason, sedition, subversion and secession against the central government, the image of DAB was severely undermined by its unconditional support and defence of the legislation. The November 2003 District Councils elections saw the worst electoral performance in party's history, only 62 of the 206 candidates were elected. The party vice-chairman and LegCo member Ip Kwok-him was defeated in his own power base and long-time headquarter Kwun Lung by the pro-democracy The Frontier member and LegCo member Cyd Ho Sau-lan by a narrow margin of 64 votes. The election results led to the resignation of chairman Tsang Yok-sing. Tsang claimed that the electoral setback was due to the DAB's "Tung loyalist" public image. In December the party's Standing Committee elected Ma Lik as Tsang's successor.

Late 2000s expansion and electoral victories (2004–2012)
The 2004 LegCo electoral campaign unfolded amid an economic rebound partly engineered by Beijing's up-lifting measures. The PRC athletes' impressive gains in the August 2004 Athens Olympics and the 50 Chinese Gold Medalists' visit to Hong Kong right before the polling induced among the voters a strong nationalistic pride that was beneficial to DAB candidates. The DAB also managed to exploit the proportional representation to equalise votes for two of the candidates the party endorsed standing in the same constituency. Although support of Chan Yuen-han (FTU) was far higher than Chan Kam-lam (DAB) in Kowloon East, according to earlier polls, the two organisations managed to have both elected. At Hong Kong Island constituency, the ticket of Ma Lik and Choy So-yuk ultimately benefitted from a democratic camp mix-up that led to the resignation of the Democratic Party Chairman, Yeung Sum. The DAB become the largest political party in the Legislative Council to be represented with 12 seats (if including the two members ran under the FTU banner), with the pro-business Liberal Party coming second with 10 seats and the Democratic Party coming third with 9 seats.

On 16 February 2005, the DAB merged with the Hong Kong Progressive Alliance, and was renamed as the Democratic Alliance for the Betterment and Progress of Hong Kong. The two parties were merged with new committees and leadership in May, Ma Lik was re-elected as chairman and Ip Kwok-him, Tam Yiu-chung, Maria Tam and Lau Kong-wah as vice-chairmen. Since the merge with the Progressive Alliance, the DAB has gradually leaned to a more pro-middle-class position. In April 2007 leadership election, solicitor Gregory So succeeded Maria Tam as the vice-chairman of the party. The four new Standing Committee members were all professionals; besides Gregory So, Cheung Kwok-kwan, the Chairman of the Young DAB was a solicitor, Starry Lee Wai-king was an accountant, Ben Chan Han-pan was an engineer. Meanwhile, the pro-labour and pro-grassroots FTU faction began to run in elections in their own banner. On 8 August 2007, Chairman Ma Lik died of cancer in Guangzhou. Tam Yiu-chung was elected as the new chairman by the Standing Committee on 28 August.

The District Council Elections in 2007 saw the great bounce back of the DAB by winning 115 seats, more than a quarter of the seats in the district level, far ahead of other political parties. Gregory So resigned as the vice-chairman and was succeeded by Ann Chiang when he was appointed as the Under Secretary for Commerce and Economic Development by Chief Executive Donald Tsang in May 2008, among other DAB members appointed to the government. Gregory So was later revealed by the media as having Canadian citizenship, which he had to renounce as a result. The scandal became an electoral issue in the following 2008 LegCo Election that the pan-democracy camp used to attack the DAB candidates. Nevertheless, the DAB remained as the largest party in the Legislative Council in the election, winning 13 seats in total (if including the FTU candidates who had DAB membership). Chan Yuen-han and Wong Kwok-hing were founding members of the DAB and used to run for the DAB, they began to run under the FTU banner with more pro-labour position. In October, Tsang Yok-sing, the founding Chairman of the DAB, was elected as the President of the Legislative Council, becoming the first LegCo President with party membership. His seat at the Executive Council was succeeded by vice-chairman Lau Kong-wah.

In the 2011 District Council Elections, the DAB recorded a greatest victory in party's history, accumulating 136 seats, about one-third of the total, more than all pro-democratic parties combined.

Leung Chun-ying era (2012–2017)
The DAB supported Leung Chun-ying in the 2012 Chief Executive election. In the Legislative Council elections in September, with the party's first use of the electoral tactics of splitting candidate lists, the DAB won three seats in the New Territories West for the first time and two seats Hong Kong Island since 2004. It continued as the largest political force supporting the SAR administration today.

The DAB stood firmly with the government in the constitutional reform debate in 2014–15, and subsequently the massive Occupy protests against the 2014 NPCSC decision. On 17 April 2015, Starry Lee Wai-king became the first woman to chair the party, succeeding the outgoing Tam Yiu-chung. In the 2015 District Council election, the first election under Starry Lee's chairmanship, the DAB retained its largest party status by winning 119 seats (including two who also ran under FTU banner), although incumbent legislators Christopher Chung and Elizabeth Quat were ousted by newcomers.

After the 2014 Occupy protests, there was an emerging pro-independence movement in which the DAB strongly opposed. In the 2016 New Territories East by-election, DAB member Holden Chow ran against the Civic Party's Alvin Yeung and pro-independence Hong Kong Indigenous' Edward Leung. Chow received about 35 per cent and about 10,000 votes short of the Civic Party candidate.

With four veteran incumbents, LegCo president Tsang Yok-sing, Tam Yiu-chung, Chan Kam-lam and  Ip Kwok-him, retiring, the DAB set a more conservative electoral strategy in the 2016 Legislative Council election, fielding only nine candidate lists in the geographical constituencies and District Council (Second) functional constituency, two fewer than the last election. The DAB got all their nine candidate lists elected as a result with three traditional functional constituencies with a drop of their vote share from 20.22 to 16.68 per cent vote share. Chan Hak-kan succeeded Ip as the new caucus convenor.

In the 2017 Chief Executive election, the DAB which commanded over 100 seats in the Election Committee, endorsed and nominated former Chief Secretary for Administration Carrie Lam, which help her to defeat former Financial Secretary John Tsang with 777 votes. In return, the Carrie Lam administration appointed Cheung Kwok-kwan to be a new member in the Executive Council.

Carrie Lam era (2017-2022)
In the March 2018 Legislative Council by-election triggered by the disqualification of Youngspiration's Yau Wai-ching over the oath-taking controversy, the DAB supported its member Vincent Cheng and the former FTU legislator Tang Ka-piu who joined the DAB before the election to run in Kowloon West and New Territories East respectively. Despite Tang's loss, Cheng made a surprising upset by narrowly defeating independent democrat Yiu Chung-yim, making it the first time the pro-Beijing camp received greater vote share than the pro-democrats in a geographical constituency since 2000 and the first time a pro-Beijing candidate won in a geographical constituency by-election since 1992.

In October 2020, Apple Daily reported that Carrie Lam had blamed the DAB for failing to raise political support for her administration, saying the DAB had failed for years in providing the government with "talent." Lam was also reported to be unhappy with two government ministers from the DAB, and fired one but kept the other to avoid embarrassing the DAB.

In November 2020, following the expulsion of 4 pro-democracy lawmakers from the Legislative Council, the DAB expressed support for the decision and accused the pro-democracy lawmakers of harming the country's interest.

In February 2021, following calls from Xia Baolong that only "patriots" should be part of the government, the DAB supported his position and said that it should be done, as it claimed pro-democracy figures had done things "[I]ncluding advocating Hong Kong independence to poison young people, supporting black violence to damage the rule of law, colluding with foreign forces to interfere in Hong Kong's affairs and even attempting to steal the power to govern by running in an election to paralyse the government."

In August 2022, after Nancy Pelosi visited Taiwan, the DAB said it fully supported the mainland Chinese government and military in response to the visit.

Ideology
The DAB is known as a Beijing loyalist party of "loving China and loving Hong Kong". It stresses the "one country" part of the "One country, two systems" principle. As for issues on democratic reform, it takes a position to support slower pace in relative to what the Democratic Party supports, DAB claims by doing so stability and prosperity will be achieved. Former party chairman Tam Yiu-chung claims the DAB to be "rational and pragmatic".

The party's main claim is that it is natural for ethnic Chinese in Hong Kong to be "patriotic" and support the government of the People's Republic of China. The party supports nearly every policy of the HKSAR Government.

 Furthering co-operation between Hong Kong and the mainland, promoting mutual trust, and creating opportunities economically.
 "Constructive monitor" of the HKSAR government, scrutinising various government policies and decisions, providing "constructive policy alternatives" whilst securing the progress, prosperity, social stability and harmony for Hong Kong.
 To break down social barriers based on the common interest of Hong Kong; to strengthen communications with Hong Kong residents to better reflect their opinion; to be more accountable to the public.
 To nurture political talent by committing the necessary funding, organising training, providing opportunities for those who want to take part in politics.

The DAB's support of social welfare improvements, including greater spending on education, housing, and employee retraining, has given it strong grassroots support.

The party in general embraces big tent positions, but has gradually leaned to a more pro-middle-class position and professional-oriented since its merger with the Hong Kong Progressive Alliance (HKPA) in 2005.

The party also takes a social conservative stance, espousing 'traditional family values' and opposing same-sex marriage despite it not being in the party's official platform. The DAB collaborated with evangelical Christian organisations in 2006 in drafting a submission on "harmonious families". These organisations include the Hong Kong branches of the Full Gospel Business Men's Fellowship International and the Christian Broadcasting Network.

Internal factions 
As the largest political party of Hong Kong, the party can be divided into several main factions:
 Business sector, with business and professionals background and also former members of the Hong Kong Progressive Alliance.
 Rural leaders representing the interests of Indigenous inhabitants of the New Territories.
 Members with Hong Kong Federation of Education Workers background.
 Unionists, i.e. members belonging or came from the Hong Kong Federation of Trade Unions.

Controversies

Comments of Tiananmen massacre
On 15 May 2007, then-party chairman Ma Lik provoked widespread condemnation within the local community when he claimed that "there was not a massacre" during the Tiananmen Square protests of 1989, as there was "no intentional and indiscriminate shooting". He said the popular belief of foreigners' "rash claims" that a massacre took place showed Hong Kong's lack of maturity. He said that Hong Kong showed, through this lack of patriotism and national identity, that it would thus "not be ready for democracy until 2022".

Vice-chairman Tam Yiu-chung defended Ma, but questioned the timing: "people will understand it gradually". However, Vice-chairman Lau Kong-wah, immediately offered to apologise, and distanced the party from Ma, saying that Ma had expressed "a personal opinion". The DAB Central committee declined any further action against Ma following their meeting, and there was no official apology.

Allegations of irregularities
The DAB has been accused by pro-democracy media and politicians of providing benefits to certain people, including seafood meals and local trips to outlying islands at prices significantly lower than market rates to win their support. Other allegations include arranging free transport to mobilise people for their causes. 

During the 2015 District Council elections, the South China Morning Post reported that elderly residents of care homes were being bussed to polling stations by DAB-arranged transport. A DAB candidate, Daniel Lam Tak-shing, was alleged to have instructed them on who to vote for outside of a polling station, raising questions on whether those votes were cast of their own will. He was also accused of giving out free gifts to these residents. However, none of these practices are strictly illegal in Hong Kong.

Young DAB 
The youth wing is the Young Democratic Alliance for the Betterment and Progress of Hong Kong (Young DAB). In August 2022, it released results of a survey, showing that 30% of those polled in Hong Kong did not identify as being Chinese. The Young DAB said that the government should enhance national identity, and vice-chairman Nicholas Muk Ka-chun said that "If you've looked at the Education Bureau's website [...] you would have noticed that the word 'patriot' does not exist".

Election performances

Legislative Council elections

Municipal elections

District Councils elections

Leadership

Chairpersons

Vice-Chairpersons
 Tam Yiu-chung, 1992–1997, 2002–2007
 Cheng Kai-nam, 1997–2000
 Ip Kwok-him, 1998–2009
 Lo Chi-keung, 2000–2005
 Maria Tam Wai-chu, 2005–2007
 Lau Kong-wah, 2005–2012
 Gregory So Kam-leung, 2007–2008
 Ann Chiang Lai-wan, 2008–2015
 Carson Wen, 2009–2011
 Horace Cheung Kwok-kwan, 2011–2022
 Starry Lee Wai-king, 2011–2015
 Thomas Pang Cheung-wai, 2013–2019
 Brave Chan Yung, 2013–present
 Gary Chan Hak-kan, 2015–present
 Holden Chow Ho-ding, 2015–present
 Chan Hok-fung, 2019–2021
 Thomas Pang Cheung-wai, 2021–present

Secretaries general
 Cheng Kai-nam, 1992–1997
 Ma Lik, 1997–2003
 Kan Chi-ho, 2003–2009
 Thomas Pang Cheung-wai, 2009–2013
 Chan Hok-fung, 2013–2019
 Albert Wong Shun-yee, 2019–2021
 Chan Hok-fung, 2021–present

Treasurers
 Wong Kine-yuen, 1992–2017
 Chong Wai-ming, 2017–present

Deputy secretaries general
 Tso Wong Man-yin, 2005–2009
 Albert Wong Shun-yee, 2009–2011
 Chan Hok-fung, 2011–2013
 Chris Ip Ngo-tung, 2013–present
 Kin Hung Kam-in, 2017–present
 Vincent Cheng Wing-shun, 2017–present
 Joe Lai Wing-ho, 2017–present
 Frankie Ngan Man-yu, 2019–present

Senate chairmen
 Jose Sun-Say Yu, 2005–2015
 Lo Man-tuen, 2015–present

Representatives

Executive Council
 Ip Kwok-him
 Cheung Kwok-kwan

Legislative Council

District Councils
The DAB has won 21 seats in 10 District Councils (2020–2023):

National People's Congress
 Chan Yung
 Choy So-yuk
 Ip Kwok-him
 Tam Yiu-chung (NPCSC member)
 Wong Ting-chung

Chinese People’s Political Consultative Conference

 Chau On Ta-yuen
 Rock Chen Chung-nin
 Chong Shaw-swee
 Chung Shui-ming
 Ip Shun-hing
 Starry Lee Wai-king
 Leung Che-cheung
 Lo Siu-kit
 Nancy Wong
 Michael Ngai Ming-tak
 Thomas Pang Cheung-wai
 Irons Sze 
 Ricky Tsang Chi-ming
 Wong Ming-yeung
 Yu Kwok-chun
 Zhou Chun-ling

See also 

 United Front Work Department
 United Front (China)
 Politics of Hong Kong
 List of political parties in Hong Kong

References

External links 

 Official website

 
Chinese nationalism
Conservative parties in Hong Kong
Chinese Communist Party
Political parties established in 1992
Political parties in Hong Kong
1992 establishments in Hong Kong
Conservative parties in China
Social conservative parties